Horace Kenton Wright (February 21, 1915–November 14, 1976), was a Bahamian artist and teacher, considered to be one of the "fathers of modern Bahamian art." In a Third World nation with limited supplies and training, young Bahamian students were limited in their knowledge of art. Wright was able during this period to "give Bahamian children an appreciation for art as a tool in industry, as well as a medium of personal expression." He was known for his watercolors.

Life
He was born in Chicago, Illinois, on February 21, 1915, to Jamaican parents Dr. Joseph and Maud Wright. At the age of two, his family relocated to The Bahamas. In 1931, Wright began his career with the Bahamas Board of Education as a teacher. After travelling to London to pursue studies in art from 1948 to 1951, Wright became The Bahamas' only art teacher, serving in this post from 1951 to 1960. He was appointed Supervisor of Art for all schools in The Bahamas in 1961, and he then served as Inspector of Schools from 1964 to 1967.

Wright received further training in Europe and Australia, which led to the final phase of his career in the field of education. From 1967 to 1975 he served as Schools Broadcasting Officer and Senior Education Officer (Audio/Visual Aids).

Wright's influence is evident as he was the teacher of some of The Bahamas' finest artistic talents, including James O. Rolle, Hervis Bain, and Stanley and Jackson Burnside.

Wright was married to the late Cynthia Irene Styles, also an educator. They were the parents of three sons, Bryan (deceased), Neil and Robin (deceased). Although Wright was never officially made a Bahamian citizen, he died believing that he was indeed Bahamian and his extensive contribution to the education of Bahamian children is indeed worthy of recognition. He died in Nassau, Bahamas, on November 14, 1976.

See also 
 List of Bahamian artists

References

Bibliography
 Bahamian Legends, Volume I - 2004
 The Bahamas Handbook 1976-1977, Dupuch Publications.

1915 births
1976 deaths
Bahamian artists
American emigrants to the Bahamas
Bahamian people of Jamaican descent
People from Nassau, Bahamas